Cerro Las Tórtolas is a peak at the border of Argentina and Chile with an elevation of  metres and located at the Central Andes. It is on the border of the Argentinean province of San Juan and Chilean province of Elqui. Its slopes are within the administrative boundaries of Argentinean city of Iglesia and Chilean commune of Vicuña.

First Ascent

The first ascents was made by Indigenous Peoples, who built a platform at the summit and left elaborate figurines there. Las Tórtolas' first recorded ascent post colonization is by Edgar Kausel (Chile) and Heinz Koch (Germany) January 19, 1952. There are reports of a 1924 ascent (Hans Duddle) shown in some sources. However no evidence of this expedition was found.

Elevation

It has an official height of 6160 meters. Other data from available digital elevation models: SRTM yields 6130 metres, ASTER 6096 metres, ASTER filled 6130 metres and TanDEM-X 6171 metres. The height of the nearest key col is 4768 meters, leading to a topographic prominence of 1377 meters. Las Tórtolas is considered a Mountain Subrange according to the Dominance System  and its dominance is 22.41%. Its parent peak is Majadita and the Topographic isolation is 54.9 kilometers.

See also
List of mountains in the Andes

References

External links
Elevation information about Las Tórtolas
Weather Forecast at Las Tórtolas

Mountains of Coquimbo Region
Mountains of San Juan Province, Argentina
Tortolas, Cerro Las
Argentina–Chile border
International mountains of South America
Six-thousanders of the Andes
Mountains of Chile